Woodring is a surname. Notable people with the surname include:

Allen Woodring (1898–1982), American sprint runner
Greig Woodring, retired Chief Executive Officer, President and Director of Reinsurance Group of America, Inc
Harry Hines Woodring (1887–1967), American politician
Jim Woodring (born 1952), American cartoonist, fine artist, writer and toy designer
John Ross Woodring (1883–1946), a newspaperman, circus showman and farmer
Kyle Woodring (1967–2009), studio and concert drummer living in the Chicago, Illinois area
Mackenzie Woodring, American cyclist who won a gold medal at the 2008 Summer Paralympics in Beijing, China
Peter Woodring (born 1968), retired U.S. soccer forward
Matthew Woodring Stover (born 1962), American fantasy and science fiction novelist

See also
Enid Woodring Regional Airport, Enid, Garfield County, Oklahoma, United States
Woodring Field, Vance Air Force Base, southern Enid, Oklahoma, United States
Mount Woodring, located in the Teton Range, Grand Teton National Park, Wyoming
Wooding
Woodrising (disambiguation)